Mesoclemmys tuberculata is a species of turtle. It is found in northeastern Brazil.

References

tuberculata
Turtles of South America
Reptiles of Brazil
Reptiles described in 1926